Felix Frolics at the Circus is an American animated short film featuring Felix the Cat and released on September 26, 1920.

Synopsis
Felix the Cat tracks down a lost circus elephant and deals with the mischievous mouse who scared it off.

See also
 Felix the Cat filmography

References
 N. B. This filmography, reflected by Wikipedia's, gives the simpler title The Circus.

External links
 Frolics at the Circus at British Pathé N. B. British Pathé gives the film the unlikely date of 1930.

1920 films
1920 animated films
1920 short films
1920s animated short films
Felix the Cat films
Circus films
1920s American films